Willie Cornelius Jones (born 1936), known as Little Willie Jones, is an American soul singer and musician.

He recorded songs such as "You're Welcome to Try" and "The – When Will I Stop Lovin' You" with the  Mellowettes on the VRC record label, described as "a Great sixties soul stomper from Newark, New Jersey with such a rough edge and a killer breakdown." He was ousted from Pat Teacake's Band and replaced by Otis Redding.

References

External links

American soul singers
Singers from New Jersey
Living people
Date of birth missing (living people)
1936 births